Ju-ho, also spelled Joo-ho, is a Korean masculine given name. The meaning differs based on the Hanja used to write each syllable of the name. There are 56 hanja with the reading "ju" and 49 hanja with the reading "ho" on the South Korean government's official list of hanja which may be registered for use in given names.

People with this name include:
Park Joo-ho (born 1987), South Korean footballer
Lee Ju-ho (born 1995), South Korean swimmer
Kang Ju-ho (born 1989), South Korean footballer

See also
List of Korean given names

References

Korean masculine given names